Scindocorax is an extinct genus of mackerel sharks that lived during the Late Cretaceous. It contains a single valid species, S. novimexicanus, from the Point Lookout Sandstone of New Mexico.

References 

Anacoracidae
Prehistoric shark genera
Santonian life
Late Cretaceous animals of North America
Fossils of the United States
Paleontology in New Mexico